Paolo de Cupis (died 1553) was a Roman Catholic prelate who served as Bishop of Recanati (1548–1553) and Bishop of Montepeloso (1546–1548).

Biography
On 27 January 1546, Paolo de Cupis was appointed during the papacy of Pope Paul III as Bishop of Montepeloso.
On 22 August 1546, he was consecrated bishop by Giovanni Giacomo Barba, Bishop of Teramo, with Giovanni Andrea Mercurio, Archbishop of Manfredonia, and Jérome Buccaurati, Bishop of Acci, serving as co-consecrators. 
On 25 February 1548, he was appointed during the papacy of Pope Paul III as Bishop of Recanati.
He served as Bishop of Recanati until his death in 1553.

References

External links and additional sources
 (Chronology of Bishops) 
 (Chronology of Bishops) 

16th-century Italian Roman Catholic bishops
Bishops appointed by Pope Paul III
1553 deaths